Stickyweed may refer to several plant species including:

Galium aparine (cleavers), an annual plant found in Africa, Asia, Australia, Europe, North America, and South America
Parietaria judaica (spreading pellitory), a perennial plant found in Europe, central and western Asia and northern Africa
Drymaria cordata, a species of the genus Drymaria